The 2015 Worcester City Council election took place on 7 May 2015 to elect members of Worcester City Council in England. This was on the same day as other local elections.

Election result

Ward results

References

2015 English local elections
May 2015 events in the United Kingdom
2015
2010s in Worcestershire